Dooabia is a genus of moths in the family Geometridae. The genus was described by Warren in 1894.

Species
 Dooabia ambigua Yazaki
 Dooabia bruneiconcha Holloway, 1996
 Dooabia lunifera (Moore, 1888)
 Dooabia myopa L. B. Prout
 Dooabia owadai Yazaki
 Dooabia plana L. B. Prout, 1916
 Dooabia puncticostata L. B. Prout, 1923
 Dooabia viridata (Moore)

References

Geometrinae
Geometridae genera